Carl E. DeVries (April 17, 1921 – September 3, 2010) was an American football coach.  He served as the head football coach at Wheaton College in Wheaton, Illinois for three seasons, from 1943 to 1945, compiling a record of 11–5–3.

References

1921 births
2010 deaths
Wheaton Thunder football coaches
People from Cottonwood County, Minnesota